Marton is a village and civil parish in the Ryedale district of North Yorkshire, England.

Marton is a rare case in the Royal Mail address book that involves two dependent localities from the post town. The addresses in Marton follow the format "Marton, Sinnington, York". Sinnington is a village slightly north of Marton, which is itself dependent on the post town of York.

References

External links

Villages in North Yorkshire
Civil parishes in North Yorkshire